Theophilus Brocas, D.D. (1705–1770) was an Anglican priest in Ireland during the Eighteenth century.

Brocas was born in Dublin and educated at Trinity College, Dublin. He was appointed Prebendary of Kilteskill in Clonfert Cathedral in 1734, and of Island Eddy at Kilmacduagh the same year. Brocas was Archdeacon of Killala  from 1736 until 1741; and Dean of Killala from then until his death. He was also the incumbent at Ringsend.

Notes

Alumni of Trinity College Dublin
18th-century Irish Anglican priests
1705 births
1770 deaths
Archdeacons of Killala
Deans of Killala